The Queen's Beasts coins are British coins issued by the Royal Mint in platinum, gold, and silver since 2016. Each of the 10 beast coins in the series features a stylized version of one of the heraldic Queen's Beasts statues present at the coronation of Queen Elizabeth II representing her royal line of ancestry. The silver coin is notable as the first two-ounce United Kingdom silver bullion coin. Engraver Jody Clark designed the entire series. In December 2016, a full line of proof-quality coins was announced. In 2017, the mint began producing a platinum version of the coin. In April 2021, the Royal Mint issued an eleventh "Completer Coin" that featured all 10 of the Queen's Beasts, taking the series to 11 coins in total. The April 2021 release included a "one of a kind" gold coin weighing 10kg and a denominated value of £10,000. Based upon the UK spot price at the time of release, the 10kg gold coin had an intrinsic scrap value of approximately £411,000. It was widely reported that the 10kg gold coin was the heaviest gold coin the Royal Mint had ever produced and that it had taken 400 hours to produce, four days to polish and has been described as a "Masterwork". The Royal Mint announced that Completer Coin completes the Queen’s Beasts commemorative collection.

Single coins were delivered in a plastic coin capsule or flip, as chosen when ordering. Bulk orders were delivered in the same containers used for packaging Britannia bullion coins: 10 coins per tube, 20 tubes per box. The tube for silver can potentially hold a total of 14 coins. Proof coins were typically delivered in a coin capsule along with a display box and a booklet explaining the beast's significance in heraldic art. 

On February 18, 2016, Wholesale Direct Metals announced that they would be the exclusive North American distributor for the Royal Mint of the Lion of England bullion coins. By mid-2016, the coins were widely available for sale and trade from a variety of sources. The proof versions were widely available in December 2016.

Common obverse 
The obverse features the fifth definitive coinage portrait of Queen Elizabeth II, surrounded by the text "ELIZABETH II • D • G • REG • F • D • (2/5/10/25/100/500/1000) POUNDS". DG REG FD is an abbreviation of the Latin "Dei Gratia Regina Fidei Defensor," meaning "By the Grace of God, Queen, Defender of the Faith". It is a form of the style of the British sovereign of Queen Elizabeth II common on coins of the Pound Sterling. The initials of artist Jody Clark appear just below the portrait.

Reverse on bullion coins 
The reverse features a stylized rendition of the beast surrounded by the text "[BEAST'S NAME] • (¼/1/2/10)oz • FINE (GOLD/SILVER/PLATINUM) • 999.(5/9) • (2016/-/2021)". Jody Clark's initials appear just below the shield, offset either to the left or to the right.

Reverse on proof and brilliant uncirculated coins 
The reverse features a slightly different stylized rendition of the beast from the bullion version, surrounded by the text "[BEAST'S NAME] • (2016/-/2021)". Jody Clark's initials appear within the shield, offset either to the left or to the right.

I. Lion of England

The Lion of England is the first in the series of Queen's Beasts coins, released in March, 2016.  The initial allocation of bullion coins from the Royal Mint sold out and were not available again until mid-June 2016. Proof versions were announced in November 2016.

II. The Griffin of Edward III

The Griffin of Edward III is the second in the series of Queen's Beasts bullion coins, released in 2017.

III. Red Dragon of Wales

The Red Dragon of Wales is the third in the series of Queen's Beasts bullion coins, released in 2017.

IV. Black Bull of Clarence

The Black Bull of Clarence is the fourth in the series of Queen's Beasts bullion coins, released 2018.

Obverse 
Beginning with this fourth release, the obverse background of the bullion versions was changed from a stucco-like finish to an arcing pattern of many small diamonds.

V. Unicorn of Scotland

The Unicorn of Scotland is the second in the series of Queen's Beasts bullion coins, released in 2018.

VI. Yale of Beaufort

The Yale of Beaufort is the sixth in the series of Queen's Beasts bullion coins, released in 2019.

VII. Falcon of the Plantagenets

The Falcon of the Plantagenets is the seventh in the series of Queen's Beasts bullion coins, released in 2019.

VIII. White Lion of Mortimer

The White Lion of Mortimer is the eighth in the series of Queen's Beasts bullion coins, released in 2020

IX. White Horse of Hanover

The White Horse of Hanover is the ninth in the series of Queen's Beasts bullion coins, released in 2020.

X. White Greyhound of Richmond

The White Greyhound of Richmond is the tenth coin in this series, Released in 2021

XI. The Completer Coin

The "Completer Coin" is a commemorative of the series and it brings together all ten of the Queen’s Beasts on one coin. It is presented in non-bullion variants with a booklet detailing the fascinating history and symbolism behind each beast. Released in April 2021. 

The Completer Coin introduced 2kg and 10kg gold versions featuring the popular Queen’s Beasts designs for the first time, and this commemoration of the series does not include several versions in the actual series such as 1/4oz gold in both proof and bullion formats.

Royal Mint's pricing strategy on the Completer Coin 
Analysis of the recommended retail price (RRP) for each of the Completer Coin variants at time of issue and comparing these with the intrinsic value provides an insight into Royal Mint's pricing strategy. The RRP changed throughout the series. The spot price per gram on 30 April 2021 for gold was £40.90; and for silver was £0.60. 

The estimate of the intrinsic value of the £5 cupro nickel coin is based upon the Royal Mint's statement made when making the business case to change the composition of the material used to produce the 10p coin from cupro nickel to steel. The statement made implied that the intrinsic value of the metal used was less than the face value of the 10p coin. When an economy uses a fiat currency, it is important that the face value of a coin is greater than the intrinsic value to prevent opportunists hoarding coins and then melting them for scrap to make a profit as was seen with the old copper 1p and 2p coins that had an intrinsic value 50% above their face value and thus the government were forced to replace them.

The intrinsic value of the 10p coin was widely reported as being close to the face value and given this, dividing a face value of old 10p by the weight of the cupro nickel in the coin (6.5g), and multiplying that intrinsic value per gram by the weight of the £5 brilliant coin (£28.28), the estimate of about £0.50 was produced. This figure shows that The Royal Mint is able to produce, market, package and distribute a high quality coin and make a profit for under £12.50 a coin.

Specifications
The following table contains specifications for each coin.

Mintage
The following table has the most recent available information on the numbers of coins minted by year and design.

See also 

Bullion
Bullion coin
Coins of the pound sterling
Gold as an investment
Inflation hedge
List of British banknotes and coins
Platinum as an investment
Royal Mint
Silver as an investment
The Queen's Beasts

References

Currencies introduced in 2016
Bullion coins of the United Kingdom
Gold bullion coins
Silver bullion coins
British gold coins